Shitan Town may refer to the following places:

China
 , a township-level administrative unit under the jurisdiction of Fengcheng City, Yichun City, Jiangxi Province
, an urban town in Qingxin District, Qingyuan City, Guangdong Province
Shitan, Xiangtan, an urban town in Xiangtan County, Xiangtan City, Hunan Province
, an urban town in Zengcheng District, Guangzhou City, Guangdong Province
Shitan railway station, a station in Shitan, Zengcheng, Guangzhou

Taiwan
Shitan, Miaoli, a rural township in Miaoli County